Okół may refer to the following places in Poland:
Okół, Podlaskie Voivodeship
Okół, Świętokrzyskie Voivodeship
Okół, part of the Stare Miasto district of Kraków